Bhaskar Jyoti Mahanta (Assamese: ভাস্কৰ জ্যোতি মহন্ত) was a 1988 batch (41RR) IPS officer of Assam-Meghalaya cadre. He was the  Director General of Assam Police, and had previously served as the special Director General of Border & sdrf Assam. He retired on 31 January 2023.

Education
Mahanta did his matriculation from Govt. Higher Secondary School, Sivasagar in the year 1977 and achieved all Assam second rank in the higher secondary examination with highest mark in Economics from Vivekanda Vidyalaya, Digboi. He pursued Bachelor of Arts in Political Science from Ramjas College, Delhi and then Master of Arts in Social Works from Delhi School of Social Work. He was selected for Indian Information Service in the 1986 and for Indian Police Service in 1987.

Police career
Mahanta, a 1988 batch Assam-Meghalaya cadre IPS, has worked in various departments in different capacity. 
Mahanta has served in below key positions for both Union and Assam Governments (Police) 
Director General of Police of Assam
Joint secretary in the department of Ministry of Heavy Industries and Public Enterprises
General of Training & Armed Police in Assam 
Additional director general of police of Administration 
Additional director general of police of Railway police 
Special Director General of Border 
Special Director General of Fire and Emergency services Assam
Special Director General of Sdrf Assam
SP in several districts of Assam

Film career

Mahanta directed Yugadrashta, an Assamese language short film based on the life of Sentineler and freedom fighter Pitambar Deva Goswami.

See also
Kuladhar Saikia

References 

People from Sivasagar district
Living people
Indian Police Service officers
Indian police chiefs
Director Generals of Assam police
1963 births